Elbert D. Glover is an American researcher and author in the field of tobacco addiction and smoking cessation. After several academic positions he retired as a professor emeritus at the University of Maryland at College Park School of Public Health where he served as chair of the Department of Behavioral and Community Health from 2005 to his retirement in 2015. Moreover, he was entrepreneur, editor, publisher and co-founder and principal owner of Health Behavior and Policy Review and co-founder, owner, editor, and publisher of American Journal of Health Behavior and Tobacco Regulatory Science. Glover was the founder of the American Academy of Health Behavior and served as its first president from 1997 to 2001.

Biography
Glover was born at the Kingsville Naval Base in Kingsville, Texas, in 1945, where his father was stationed in the US Navy. He is the oldest of eight children. Upon graduation from Roy Miller High School in Corpus Christi, Texas, in 1963, he attended Texas Tech University on a football scholarship and graduated in 1969. In 1972, he received a master's degree from Texas A&I University since renamed Texas A&M Kingsville and in 1977 received a PhD from Texas Woman's University, all in health education.

His initial academic professorial position was as visiting assistant professor at Texas A&M University (1975–1976). Subsequently, he served as assistant professor at the University of Kansas (1976–1978) and Texas Christian University (1978–1982). Moreover, he served as associate professor and chair at Oklahoma State University (1982–1983) and associate professor at East Carolina University (1985–1988). While at East Carolina University he was promoted to professor. Thereafter, he served as professor at Pennsylvania State University (1988–1990) followed by a position as professor in behavioral medicine and psychiatry at West Virginia University School of Medicine (1990–2005). While at West Virginia University School of Medicine, he was also appointed as a professor in the Department of Family Medicine and Associate, Center for Addictions, Chestnut Hospital (1990–2005). He was founding director of the Tobacco Research Center, Mary Babb Randolph Cancer Center (1990–1999), founding director, Clinical Trials Research, Behavioral Medicine and Psychiatry (1999–2001) and founding director of the Addiction and Psychiatric Medicine Research Center (2001–2005) at West Virginia University School of Medicine. After his West Virginia University tenure, he accepted a professor and chairperson position at the University of Maryland at College Park School of Public Health (2005–2015). At the University of Maryland, he was the founding director of the Center for Health Behavior Research until his 2015 retirement where he was named professor emeritus in the Department of Behavioral and Community Health, School of Public Health.

Research
Glover's research initially focused on smokeless tobacco; however, his primary research interest progressed to the development and testing of pharmacological cessation aids for smokers interested in stopping the addiction of tobacco. He conducted clinical trials with the use of all delivery forms of nicotine available on the US and European markets, to include nicotine gum, transdermal patches, oral nicotine inhalers, nasal spray, and sublingual tablets. Glover also conducted trials with bupropion (Zyban, a monocyclic antidepressant) and varenicline (Chantix, a nicotine receptor and partial agonist) which resulted in both being approved for use in the US. In addition, he studied the use of lobeline as a nicotine blocker, and various psychoactive substances including anti-depressants and anti-anxiety agents. He also investigated rimonabant (a cannabinoid receptor inverse agonist), and 3′AmNic-rEPA (a nicotine conjugate vaccine) as smoking cessation aids.

He received research grants from the government U.S. Department of Education, Centers for Disease Control, National Cancer Institute, National Institute of Drug Abuse, and National Institutes of Health. Also, received grants from the manufacturers of smoking cessation aids and conducted various pharmaceutical testing for many companies.

Professional accomplishments

His research resulted in authoring and co-authoring more than 200 professional publications. Also, as principal and co-investigator received approximately $45 million in grant funding primarily in the area of tobacco. He delivered over 550 invited medical grand rounds/workshops on the subject to physicians and presented 335 national and international professional presentations to various medical and health professional organizations.

Glover was owner, publisher and editor of the American Journal of Health Behavior, Health Behavior and Policy Review and Tobacco Regulatory Science. In 2020, he sold his major portion of Health Behavior and Policy Review and in 2021 sold the American Journal of Health Behavior and Tobacco Regulatory Science. He was the founder (1997) and first president (1997–2001), of the American Academy of Health Behavior where he was named Fellow (1998), Research Laureate (2008) and awarded the Lifetime Achievement Award (2000) by the academy. He was selected as fellow of the American School Health Association & the Royal Institute of Public Health. He was elected Fellow (1991) and received the Distinguished Scholar Award from the American Association of Health Education (2003). Moreover, he received the AAHPERD Alliance Scholar Award being only the 4th health educator in its history to receive this award (2005).

Public work
Glover's work appeared or featured on many television programs, including Dateline, 20/20, The Charlie Rose Show, Good Morning America, PM Magazine, Health Talk America, MD-TV, CBS Morning News, Peter Jennings News World Report, and NBC Evening News. His research has also been featured in numerous popular publications such as Ladies Home Journal, Newsweek, Reader's Digest, Seventeen, Time, and USA Today.

He served in various capacities primarily as reviewer and ad hoc reviewer for 20 key health academic journals and/or publications among these are the American Journal of Public Health, Addictive Behaviors, NCI Journal, Journal Clinical Advances in Smoking Cessation, Physician and Sportsmedicine, Medical Self-Care, Public Health Reports, American Journal of Health Education, Journal of School Health, Journal of Family Practice, Journal of Alcohol and Drug Education, Advances in Dental Research, Mayo Clinic Proceedings, Southern Medical Journal, Nicotine & Tobacco Research, Drug Discovery Today, and the Journal of the American Medical Association.

Criticism and controversy 
The May–June 2021 edition of the American Journal of Health Behavior, "Special Issue on Juul" generated controversy and negative feedback from some in the research and health communities when it was revealed that the entire issue and related research were funded by Juul. The funding included additional fees stipulated to make the issue freely available to the public referred to as open access. AJHB typically charges up to $180 yearly for access to their content by individuals and $375 by institutions.

To avoid bias reviews, Glover solicited peer reviews of the studies being considered for the issue without disclosing that the studies were funded by Juul. Juul employees have indicated that all of the content for the issue was overseen by Glover. As journal policy dictated, articles submitted to peers for review by Glover had the name of the sponsor redacted. When a tobacco regulatory scientist that reviewed and critiqued two studies for the journal questioned Glover about what she described as "fishy" aspects of the studies, Glover responded to the peer review group "It has been brought to my attention that some reviewers were unaware that the special issue on e-cigarettes is being funded by JUUL. My apologies for not alerting everyone. ... I honestly did not believe it to be a concern as the comprehensive reviews always purge weak or biased manuscripts. Funders are never revealed till after the review process and publication has been completed." This obfuscation was called "a horrible ethical breach" by Brian Jenssen, a pediatrician who specializes in tobacco policy research at Children's Hospital of Philadelphia. Glover's solicitation e-mail seeking reviews was also described as "unusual" in that it offered reviewers a cash payment if reviews were submitted within one week. Despite being listed online, a reviewer also noted that AJHB practice of charging article authors "hefty fees" for their publication, which is atypical for academic journals, was not made clear. Dr. Robert Taylor, an ethical investigator noted the fees with the number of articles published would easily fall well in the bottom of the fees charged for a special issue with open access.

After publication of the issue, three members of AJHB editorial board resigned in protest. Glover stated that the journal followed its standard protocol for vetting before publication. Due to a cancer diagnosis, he retired soon after the issue was released.

References

Further reading
 Black, R., and Laflin, M. (2003). "Viewpoint: Conversation with Elbert D. Glover", PhD, FASHA, FRIPH, FAAHB. American Journal of Health Behavior, 27(6)
 "Elbert D. Glover ... Smokeless tobacco researcher". Pieces of Eight, May 1, 1987.
 Nuzzo, R. (2006). "For smokers: A shot at quitting". Los Angeles Times.
 "Quitters get a shot in the arm" Daily Record (Baltimore, Maryland), July 2006.
 Glover ED. "Keeping the dream alive: the back story". Health Behavior Research. 2021;4(2):11th article. 
 "Nicotine addiction: up in smoke" TERP, Vol 4, no.2, Winter 2007.

External links 
Faculty webpage at University of Maryland School of Public Health
Professional C.V.
American Journal of Health Behavior
Health Behavior and Policy Review
Tobacco Regulatory Science

Texas Tech University alumni
Texas A&M University–Kingsville alumni
Texas Woman's University alumni
Fellows of the American Academy of Health Behavior
American public health doctors
Living people
University of Maryland, College Park faculty
Oklahoma State University faculty
Texas Christian University faculty
Texas Woman's University faculty
University of North Texas faculty
Texas A&M University faculty
University of Kansas faculty
East Carolina University faculty
West Virginia University faculty
Year of birth missing (living people)
People from Kingsville, Texas
People from Corpus Christi, Texas
Tobacco researchers